Alexander Spitzmüller (June 12, 1862 in Vienna, Austrian Empire – September 5, 1953 in Velden am Wörther See, Allied-occupied Austria) was an Austrian lawyer, bank director, and politician. In 1886, he entered the Austrian Ministry of Finance, where he held various positions for the next 35 years, culminating in becoming Austrian Minister of Commerce 1915-1916, serving as Austrian Minister of Finances 1916–1917, and finally Austro-Hungarian Minister of Finances from September 7, 1918 to November 10, 1918. Between 1919 and 1922, he served as Governor of the Austro-Hungarian Bank and was entrusted with its liquidation.

1862 births
1953 deaths
Politicians from Vienna
Lawyers from Vienna
Finance ministers of Austria-Hungary